Pouya Tajik, (born October 28, 1980, in Tehran) is a professional Iranian basketball player who currently plays for BEEM Mazandaran BC of the Iranian Super League and also for the Iranian national basketball team. He is a 6-foot-nine-inch power forward

Tajik spent the first several years of his professional career with Paykan Tehran, also of the Iranian Super League.  Following the 2006 season, he joined BEEM Mazandaran BC.

Tajik is also a long-time member of the Iran national basketball team.  He first played for the team at the ABC Championship 2003 as a 20-year-old and later participated at the FIBA Asia Championship 2005.  Although he was not part of the Iranian side that won the 2007 Championship, he rejoined the team for their second consecutive gold medal run at the FIBA Asia Championship 2009.  He saw action in eight of nine games off the bench for the Iranians.He retired in year 2016 after almost 20 years of playing basketball. In the spring of 2016 he opened up a Basketball academy and started to teach under 18 young players. In summer of 2017 he was chosen for the Iranian youth national basketball team as assistant coach. Meanwhile, he attended a Basketball coaching school in university of Budapest, Budapest, Hungary.
As a head coach, he started his career in Shahrdari Qazvin early in 2020.

References 

Living people
Iranian men's basketball players
Asian Games bronze medalists for Iran
Asian Games medalists in basketball
Basketball players at the 2006 Asian Games
Power forwards (basketball)
Medalists at the 2006 Asian Games
Islamic Solidarity Games competitors for Iran
1980 births